Philip T. Handy (born August 24, 1971) is an American basketball assistant coach of the Los Angeles Lakers of the National Basketball Association (NBA), and player development trainer. He played college basketball for the Hawaii Rainbow Warriors, and then played professionally abroad before starting his career in coaching.

Early life
Born in San Leandro, California, he grew up in Hayward - Union City, California.

College career
After a year of junior college, Handy attended University of Hawaii from 1993 to 1995. During his tenure with the Rainbows he was a WAC champion, and first Team All defense selection.

Professional career
Handy played for the Golden State Warriors and Portland Trail Blazers during the pre-season, in the Continental Basketball Association for the Omaha Racers, Grand Rapids Mackers (via dispersal draft from Omaha), La Crosse Bobcats (rights traded to Fort Wayne Fury on 12 October 1998) and internationally in France (SLUC Nancy Basket), Italy, Germany, Spain, Israel (Maccabi Hadera), England (Manchester Giants), and Australia (Melbourne Tigers and West Sydney Razorbacks). Never a crowd favourite Razorback fans took particular delight in chanting "You're useless Handy".

He obtained a CBA All-Rookie First Team (1995–96), and a British Basketball League championship with the Manchester Giants in the season 1999–2000.

Coaching career
Handy has served as player development coach for the Los Angeles Lakers under Mike Brown. Still under Brown, he served as assistant coach with the Cleveland Cavaliers.
He then moved to the Toronto Raptors as assistant for Nick Nurse. He then moved back to the Lakers under Frank Vogel.

Handy went to 6 consecutive NBA Finals, 4 with the Cleveland Cavaliers (2015–2018), 1 with the Toronto Raptors (2019), and 1 with the Los Angeles Lakers (2020) winning championships in 2016, 2019, and 2020.

References

External links
Pro A statistics
NBL statistics

1971 births
Living people
American expatriate basketball people in Australia
American expatriate basketball people in Canada
American expatriate basketball people in France
American expatriate basketball people in Germany
American expatriate basketball people in Israel
American expatriate basketball people in Italy
American expatriate basketball people in Spain
American expatriate basketball people in the United Kingdom
American men's basketball players
Basketball coaches from California
Basketball players from Oakland, California
Cleveland Cavaliers assistant coaches
Grand Rapids Mackers players
Guards (basketball)
Hawaii Rainbow Warriors basketball players
Junior college men's basketball players in the United States
La Crosse Bobcats players
Los Angeles Lakers assistant coaches
Manchester Giants players
Omaha Racers players
SLUC Nancy Basket players
Toronto Raptors assistant coaches